Unión Esportiva Cornellà, S. A. D. is a Spanish football team based in Cornellà de Llobregat, in the autonomous community of Catalonia. Founded in 1951 it plays in Primera División RFEF – Group 2, holding home games at RCDE stadium, which has a capacity of 40,000 spectators.

History 

Unión Deportiva Cornellà was founded on April 29, 1951 by the merging of Club Atlético Padró and Academia Junyent. Since its foundation the club participated in regional competitions and Tercera División until the season 2013/2014, when it achieved the historic promotion to the Segunda División B.

On 6 January 2021, Cornellà upset La Liga giants Atlético Madrid by a score of 1–0 in the second round of the Copa del Rey. They were eliminated in the following round by Barcelona, as the final score was 2–0 after extra time.

Season to season

2 seasons in Primera División RFEF
7 seasons in Segunda División B
12 seasons in Tercera División

Players

Current squad
.

Youth players

Out on loan

Honours
Tercera División: 2013–14

Notable players

References

External links
Official website 
Futbolme team profile 
Club & stadium history - Estadios de España 

 
Football clubs in Catalonia
Association football clubs established in 1951
1951 establishments in Spain
Cornellà de Llobregat
Primera Federación clubs